Gorgyra diversata, the dark leaf sitter, is a butterfly in the family Hesperiidae. It is found in Guinea, Sierra Leone, Liberia, Ivory Coast, Ghana, Togo, Nigeria, Cameroon, the Republic of the Congo, the Central African Republic, Angola, the Democratic Republic of the Congo, Uganda (from the western part of the country to Bwamba) and western Kenya. The habitat consists of forests.

References

Butterflies described in 1937
Erionotini